α-Guaiene synthase (EC 4.2.3.87, PatTps177 (gene)) is an enzyme with systematic name (2E,6E)-farnesyl-diphosphate diphosphate-lyase (cyclizing, α-guaiene-forming). This enzyme catalyses the following chemical reaction

 (2E,6E)-farnesyl diphosphate  α-guaiene + diphosphate

This enzyme requires Mg2+.

References

External links 
 

EC 4.2.3